Stefan Gierasch (February 5, 1926 – September 6, 2014) was an American film and television actor.

Career
Gierasch made over 100 screen appearances, mostly in American television, beginning in 1951. In the mid-1960s, he performed with the Trinity Square Players in Providence, Rhode Island. He appeared in dozens of films including in The Hustler (1961), The Traveling Executioner (1970), Jeremiah Johnson (1972), What's Up Doc? (1972), High Plains Drifter (1973), Carrie (1976), Silver Streak (1976), Victory at Entebbe (1976), Blue Sunshine (1977), The Champ (1979), Blood Beach (1980) and Perfect (1985).

In 1994 he appeared in the Arnold Schwarzenegger and Danny DeVito film Junior as Edward Sawyer, and in 1995's Murder in the First as Warden James Humson.  Gierasch made many TV appearances, as in Kung Fu, M*A*S*H, Starsky & Hutch, Gunsmoke (1966 S12E6’s “Gunfighter, RIP”), Star Trek: The Next Generation, Barney Miller and ER.

Death
Gierasch died from a stroke in 2014 at the age of 88.

Selected filmography

The Young Don't Cry (1957) – Billy
That Kind of Woman (1959) – Soldier (uncredited)
The Hustler (1961) – Preacher
The Traveling Executioner (1970) – Willy Herzallerliebst
What's Up Doc? (1972) – Fritz
Jeremiah Johnson (1972) – Del Gue
The New Centurions (1972) – Landlord
High Plains Drifter (1973) – Mayor Jason Hobart
Claudine (1974) – Sanitation Foreman
Cornbread, Earl and Me (1975) – Sgt. Danaher
The Great Texas Dynamite Chase (1976) – Hotel Clerk
Carrie (1976) – Mr. Morton
Silver Streak (1976) – Professor Schreiner & Johnson
Victory at Entebbe (1976) – General Mordecai Gur
Blue Sunshine (1977) – Lt. Jennings
The Champ (1979) – Charlie Goodman
Blood Beach (1980) – Dr. Dimitrios
Perfect (1985) – Charlie
The Rosary Murders (1987) – Trupiano
Spellbinder (1988) – Edgar DeWitt
Miami Vice episode 5x16 "Victim of Circumstance" (1989)
Megaville (1990) – Dr. Vogel
Mistress (1992) – Stuart Stratland, Sr.
Jack the Bear (1993) – Father-in-Law
Dave (1993) – House Majority Leader
Junior (1994) – Edward Sawyer
Murder in the First (1995) – Warden James Humson
Starry Night (1999) – Professor Beckmore
Legend of the Phantom Rider (2002) – Nathan
The Hunter's Moon (2009) – The Sage (final film role)

References

External links

Stefan Gierasch at the University of Wisconsin's Actors Studio audio collection

1926 births
American male film actors
American male television actors
2014 deaths
Male actors from New York City
20th-century American male actors